Washington-Wilkes Comprehensive High School is a public high school in Wilkes County, Georgia, United States. It is located at 1182 Tignall Road. The school's teams are known as the Tigers.

References

Public high schools in Georgia (U.S. state)
Education in Wilkes County, Georgia